Amanda Lucas may refer to:

 Amanda Lucas (fighter) (born 1981), professional mixed martial artist and daughter of George Lucas
 Amanda Lucas (netball) (born 1983), Australian netball player